Nazarovo is a rural locality (a village) in Bryzgalovskoye Rural Settlement, Kameshkovsky District, Vladimir Oblast, Russia. The population was 56 as of 2010.

Geography 
Nazarovo is located 14 km northeast of Kameshkovo (the district's administrative centre) by road. Bryzgalovo is the nearest rural locality.

References 

Rural localities in Kameshkovsky District